The 2nd Central Committee of the Workers' Party of Vietnam (WPV) was elected at the 2nd WPV National Congress. It elected the 2nd Politburo and the 2nd  Secretariat.

Plenums
The Central Committee (CC) is not a permanent institution. Instead, it convenes plenary sessions between party congresses. When the CC is not in session, decision-making powers are delegated to its internal bodies; that is, the Politburo and the Secretariat. None of these organs are permanent bodies either; typically, they convene several times a month.

Composition

Members

Alternates

References

Bibliography
 
 
 
 

2nd Central Committee of the Workers' Party of Vietnam